Alejandro José Hernández Hernández (born 10 November 1982) is a Spanish professional football referee. He has been a full international for FIFA since 2014.

References

External links 
 
 
 

1982 births
Living people
Spanish football referees
People from Arrecife
Sportspeople from the Province of Las Palmas